Owen Davidson and Billie Jean King were the defending champions, but lost in the semifinals to Ken Fletcher and Margaret Court.

Fletcher and Court defeated Alex Metreveli and Olga Morozova in the final, 6–1, 14–12 to win the mixed doubles tennis title at the 1968 Wimbledon Championships.

Seeds

  Owen Davidson /  Billie Jean King (semifinals)
  Pancho Gonzales /  Rosie Casals (quarterfinals)
  Fred Stolle /  Ann Jones (semifinals)
  Ken Fletcher /  Margaret Court (champions)

Draw

Finals

Top half

Section 1

Section 2

Section 3

Section 4

Bottom half

Section 5

Section 6

Section 7

Section 8

References

External links

1968 Wimbledon Championships – Doubles draws and results at the International Tennis Federation

X=Mixed Doubles
Wimbledon Championship by year – Mixed doubles